Guro Pettersen (born 22 August 1991) is a Norwegian football goalkeeper who currently plays for the Toppserien club Vålerenga. She has several matches for Norway national youth football teams and has been called up to the Norwegian national team on numerous occasions. She got her debut at the national team at the age of 30, 7 April 2022.

Career
She started her career in Fløya in 2008, moving south in 2012 to Stabæk and Vålerenga (two periods in each). Between 2007 and 2014 she also played for Norwegian age-specific national teams.

She first got national media attention, when tweeting that she should show the Stabæk manager "some of my other qualities", in order to dethrone Ingrid Hjelmseth as first-choice goalkeeper. The tweet alluded to Stabæk manager allegedly having a romantic affair with one of the other players. According to the reports, Pettersen got this attention unwillingly because she was hacked She was immediately approached by men's magazines to do photo shoots. She later alleged that the hosts of a football podcast she was guesting, asked her if she had ever slept with a male professional footballer. The podcast was never aired. Pettersen participated in debates on the gender inequality in football.

In the winter of 2017, during the Norwegian off-season, she was loaned out to Danish club Fortuna Hjørring for the remainder of the 2016–17 Elitedivisionen. She was benched twice in the 2016-17 UEFA Women's Champions League, but did not make a mark in Hjørring and was loaned out to Arna-Bjørnar for the remainder of 2017.

Ahead of the 2020 season she joined Swedish Piteå. She decided on the move in order to fight her way onto the Norwegian national team. She was called up several times in the 2010s, but last in 2015, before Martin Sjögren took over as head coach. She was eventually called up to the national team in September 2020. In 2010 and 2021 she was benched 9 times for the national team.

In May 2021 Pettersen scored a goal for Piteå in open play, clearing the ball from the midfield. At the end of the season she was given the Goal of the Year award in the 2021 Damallsvenskan. At the time, the Twitter video of the goal had been watched 100,000 times. She did however leave Piteå after the season, to commence her third spell in Vålerenga.

See also
List of goalscoring goalkeepers

References

1991 births
Living people
People from Tromsø
Norwegian women's footballers
IF Fløya players
Stabæk Fotball Kvinner players
Vålerenga Fotball Damer players
Fortuna Hjørring players
Arna-Bjørnar players
Piteå IF (women) players
Toppserien players
Damallsvenskan players
Norway women's youth international footballers
Women's association football goalkeepers
Norwegian expatriate women's footballers
Expatriate women's footballers in Denmark
Norwegian expatriate sportspeople in Denmark
Expatriate women's footballers in Sweden
Norwegian expatriate sportspeople in Sweden
UEFA Women's Euro 2022 players